Elliott is a village in Ford County, Illinois, United States. The population was 295 at the 2010 census.

Geography
Elliott is located at  (40.464833, -88.271501).

History
Elliott was named for the landowner of the village site, Samuel Elliott. The Elliott Post Office was established in 1871.

Demographics

As of the census of 2000, there were 341 people, 127 households, and 106 families. The racial makeup of the village was 98.53% White, and 1.47% from two or more races. Hispanic or Latino of any race were 0.29% of the population.

There were 127 households, out of which 37.8% had children under the age of 18 living with them, 64.6% were married couples living together, 12.6% had a female householder with no husband present, and 16.5% were non-families. 11.8% of all households were made up of individuals, and 6.3% had someone living alone who was 65 years of age or older.  The average household size was 2.69 and the average family size was 2.87.

In the village, the population was spread out, with 28.7% under the age of 18, 9.1% from 18 to 24, 24.9% from 25 to 44, 24.6% from 45 to 64, and 12.6% who were 65 years of age or older.  The median age was 36 years. For every 100 females, there were 92.7 males.  For every 100 females age 18 and over, there were 94.4 males.

The median income for a household in the village was $41,000, and the median income for a family was $44,375. Males had a median income of $30,556 versus $25,000 for females. The per capita income for the village was $18,203.  About 6.4% of families and 8.5% of the population were below the poverty line, including 14.8% of those under age 18 and 16.7% of those age 65 or over.

References

Villages in Ford County, Illinois
Villages in Illinois